Aechmea hoppii is a plant species in the genus Aechmea. This species is native to Colombia, Ecuador and Peru.

Cultivars
 Aechmea 'Caprice'

References

hoppii
Flora of South America
Plants described in 1935